(subtitled Two Episodes from the Life of Niels Lyhne in Eleven Pictures, RT I/8) is a German-language opera with four interludes, by the English composer Frederick Delius. It is usually performed and recorded in English, as Fennimore and Gerda in a translation by Philip Heseltine. The German libretto, by the composer himself, is based on the novel Niels Lyhne by the Danish writer Jens Peter Jacobsen. In neither German nor English is the libretto highly regarded; rather, the work is considered an "orchestral opera", limited in its dramatic appeal but voluptuous and engaging in its instrumental texture.

Delius began writing Fennimore und Gerda in 1908; he finished in 1910, but the premiere, intended for the Cologne Opera, was delayed by the First World War and did not take place until 21 October 1919, and then by the Oper Frankfurt. It was the composer's last opera. The United States premiere of the work was staged by the Opera Theatre of Saint Louis in June 1981 with Kathryn Bouleyn as Fennimore and Kathryn Gamberoni as Gerda.

Roles

Synopsis
Place: Denmark
Time: Around 1860

Two cousins, the writer Niels Lyhne and the painter Erik Refstrup, are in love with the consul's daughter, Fennimore. She chooses Erik but the marriage begins to break down as a result of the artist's drinking and Fennimore embarks on an affair with Niels. Erik is killed in an accident and, overwhelmed with guilt, Fennimore breaks off the affair. The rejected Niels spends years travelling before he settles down and marries his neighbour's daughter, Gerda.

Recordings
Fennimore and Gerda – Elisabeth Söderström, Brian Rayner Cook, Robert Tear, Birger Brandt, Danish National Radio Choir and Symphony Orchestra, conducted by Meredith Davies (HMV, 1976; reissued on EMI CD, 1997)
Fennimore and Gerda – Randi Stene, Judith Howarth, Mark Tucker, Peter Coleman-Wright, Danish National Radio Choir and Symphony Orchestra, conducted by Richard Hickox (Chandos, 1999)

References

Further reading
Holden, Amanda (ed.), The New Penguin Opera Guide, New York: Penguin Putnam, 2001.

External links
Complete cast list, notes, extensive synopsis

Operas
1919 operas
Operas by Frederick Delius
English-language operas
Operas based on novels
Operas set in Denmark
Operas set in the 19th century